The Perceptionists is an American hip hop group from Boston, Massachusetts. The group initially had three members: Mr. Lif, Akrobatik, and DJ Fakts One. The group was signed to the Definitive Jux label. In 2005, the trio released a studio album, Black Dialogue. Shortly after the release of Black Dialogue, DJ Fakts One left the group. In 2017, they released their second studio album Resolution, with Mr. Lif and Akrobatik as the only two members of the group performing on the album.

Members

Current
 Mr. Lif (Jeffrey Haynes) – rapper
 Akrobatik (Jared Bridgeman) – rapper

Former
 DJ Fakts One (Jason Goler) – producer, DJ

Discography

Studio albums
 Black Dialogue (2005)
 Resolution (2017)

Live albums
 Live and Direct (2005)

Remix albums
 Low Resolution (2018)

Mixtapes
 The Razor (2004)

Singles
 "Medical Aid" (2004)
 "Memorial Day" (2004)
 "Blo" (2005)
 "Black Dialogue" (2005)
 "The Razor" (2005)

References

External links
 The Perceptionists at Definitive Jux
 
 

American hip hop groups
Musical groups from Boston
American musical duos
Musical groups established in 2004
Definitive Jux artists
Mello Music Group artists